Yorkview was an Ontario provincial electoral district (riding), in the former city of North York from 1963 to 1999. The riding was established for the 1963 Ontario general election. The riding was abolished in preparation for the 1999 Ontario general election. It was partitioned into the current provincial ridings of York West, York Centre and York South—Weston.

Its first and  longest-serving Member of Provincial Parliament (MPP) was Fred Young, who served the riding as an Ontario New Democratic Party (NDP) member, from 1963 until his retirement in 1981.  The last MPP to represent the riding was Ontario Liberal Party member, Mario Sergio.  Sergio went on to win the first election of the new riding of York West, which contained the majority of the former Yorkview riding.

Boundaries
Its original boundaries were Steeles Avenue West on the north, the western boundary was the Humber River, the eastern boundary was Keele Street and the southern boundary meandered south from the Humber along Weston Road, east to Lawrence Avenue West, then south along Jane Street to Eglinton Avenue West.

In 1975 the riding boundaries were changed. From the southwest corner where Highway 401 crossed the Humber River the boundary followed the river north to Finch Avenue West. It then turned east following Finch to Highway 400. It then turned north following Highway 400 to Steeles Avenue West. It then followed Steeles east to Keele Street and then south along Keele to Sheppard Avenue West. It then went west along Sheppard to Jane Street and then south along Jane to Highway 401. It then followed Highway 401 back west to the Humber River.

The boundary changed again in 1987. From the southwest corner where Highway 401 crossed the Humber River the boundary followed the river north to Steeles Avenue West. It then turned east following Steeles until it reached Black Creek. It followed the river course south to Finch Avenue West. It then turned west following Finch to Keele Street. It then turned south following Keele until it reached Highway 401. It then followed Highway 401 back west to the Humber River.

Members of Provincial Parliament

Election results

References

Former provincial electoral districts of Ontario
Provincial electoral districts of Toronto